Magic Valley is a 2011 American drama film directed by Jaffe Zinn, starring Scott Glenn, Kyle Gallner, Alison Elliott, Brad William Henke, Matthew Gray Gubler and Will Estes.

Cast
 Scott Glenn as Ed Halfner
 Kyle Gallner as TJ Waggs
 Alison Elliott as Martha Garabrant
 Brad William Henke as Jerry Garabrant
 Matthew Gray Gubler as Mok
 Will Estes as Jimmy Duvante
 Daniel Frandson as Chad
 Landon Abercrombie as Jason
 Johnny Lewis as John

Release
The film premiered at the Rome Film Festival on 31 October 2011. The film was released to VOD on 9 April 2013.

Reception
Ronnie Scheib of Variety wrote that the film "puts its unique stamp on a ubiquitous dead-child theme".

Jordan Mintzer of The Hollywood Reporter praised the performances of Glenn and Henke while writing that the film is "not quite the sum of its parts" and "never builds into either a nail-biting investigation nor into a truly captivating mediation on life and death in America’s heartland" despite "many well-executed sequences".

References

External links
 
 

American drama films
2011 drama films